Haddadus binotatus (common name: clay robber frog) is a species of frog in the family Craugastoridae. Haddadus binotatus is a very common frog. It inhabits primary and secondary forest and forest edges. It is usually found in the leaf-litter on the forest floor, or on leaves in low vegetation inside the forest.

It is endemic to the Brazilian Atlantic forest and most dominantly found in the states of Rio de Janeiro and Espírito Santo. The density of leaf eating frogs like Haddadus binotatus is higher in Central America than southern America. The Haddadus binotatus is a direct-developing frog and the most abundant species in the community.   

Female frogs reach  snout–vent length. The female of the species were larger than the males, which may result from the production of larger eggs.

References

Haddadus
Endemic fauna of Brazil
Amphibians of Brazil
Amphibians described in 1824
Taxonomy articles created by Polbot